Xie Shileng (20 May 1935 – 7 November 2018) was a Chinese port and coastal engineer who served as an assistant chief engineer of the First Navigational Engineering Survey and Design Institute of the Ministry of Transport.

Biography
Xie was born in Cixi, Zhejiang on May 20, 1935. After graduating from the Dalian University of Technology in August 1956, he was assigned to the Water Transport Planning and Design Institute of the Ministry of Transport. One year later he was transferred to its First Navigational Engineering Survey and Design Institute. After the Cultural Revolution in November 1979, Xie pursued advanced studies in the Netherlands, where he studied at Delft University of Technology. In 1999 he was elected an academician of the Chinese Academy of Engineering. He died of lymphoma in Tianjin, on November 7, 2018.

Awards
 1985 Second Prize of the State Science and Technology Progress Award
 2007 First Prize of the State Science and Technology Progress Award
 2013 First Prize of the State Science and Technology Progress Award

References

1935 births
2018 deaths
People from Cixi
Dalian University of Technology alumni
Engineers from Zhejiang
Members of the Chinese Academy of Engineering
Delft University of Technology alumni
Deaths from cancer in the People's Republic of China
Deaths from lymphoma
Transport engineers
Chinese civil engineers